Ole Brandt (4 January 1818 – 4 August 1880) was a Norwegian farmer and politician.

He graduated from Asker Seminary in 1837. He moved to his native Vestre Slidre in 1839 and settled at the farm Løken. He served as mayor from 1849 to 1855 and from 1860.

He was elected to the Parliament of Norway in 1859. He was later re-elected in 1862, then missed one term. He was elected in 1868, then missed another term before serving as a deputy representative in 1874-1876 winning one last election in 1876. He represented the constituency of Christians Amt.

References

1818 births
1880 deaths
People from Vestre Slidre
Norwegian farmers
Members of the Storting
Mayors of places in Oppland